The Indianapolis mayoral election of 1959 took place on November 3, 1959 and saw the reelection of Charles H. Boswell, who had become mayor eleven months earlier, after Philip L. Bayt resigned to become Marion County Prosecutor. Boswell defeated Republican William T. Sharp.

Results
Boswell won election.

1959 was a good year for Democrats in Indiana's mayoral elections, with the party winning control of the mayoralties of all of the state's top seven most populous cities. This is a feat that the Democratic Party would not replicate until 2003.

References

1959
1959 United States mayoral elections
1959 Indiana elections